Granja de Torrehermosa is a municipality in the province of Badajoz, Extremadura, Spain. 
According to the 2014 census, the municipality has a population of 2,186 inhabitants.

Villages
Aldea de los Rubios

References

External links

Municipalities in the Province of Badajoz